Pauline Manser (born 2 February 1969 in Mount Gambier, South Australia) is an Australian volleyball coach and former professional beach volleyball and indoor volleyball player.

Career

Playing indoor volleyball Manser represented Australia 104 times between 1987 to 1996. She was one of the inaugural inductees to the Australian Volleyball Hall of Fame in 2012 in recognition of her indoor volleyball career.

Manser competed in the women's tournament of the 2000 Summer Olympics alongside Tania Gooley. They finished fifth.

Prior to teaming up with Gooley in August 1999, Manser had played alongside Kerri Pottharst from March 1998. She began her international competitive career alongside Liane Fenwick in 1997.

From 2010 to 2014 Manser was coach of the Australian women's national volleyball team. In 2015 she was appointed assistant coach to the Lobos team at the University of New Mexico.

References

External links
 

1969 births
Living people
Australian women's beach volleyball players
Beach volleyball players at the 2000 Summer Olympics
Olympic beach volleyball players of Australia
Sportswomen from South Australia